Alina Maratovna Kabaeva or Kabayeva (born 12 May 1983) is a Russian politician, media manager and retired individual rhythmic gymnast, who has been designated Honoured Master of Sports by the Russian government.

Kabaeva is one of the most decorated gymnasts in rhythmic gymnastic history, with 2 Olympic medals, 14 World Championship medals, and 21 European Championship medals. She is reportedly the longtime mistress of Russian president Vladimir Putin.

From 2007 to 2014, Kabaeva was a State Duma Deputy from United Russia.

Early life and family
Kabaeva was born on 12 May 1983 in Tashkent, Uzbek SSR, Soviet Union, the daughter of Lyubov Kabaeva and Marat Kabayev, a professional football player. Her father is a Muslim Tatar and her mother is Russian. Her younger sister, Leysan Kabaeva, is the general director of a real estate agency and in 2016 was appointed as a judge of the Almetyevsk City Court in Tatarstan by Russian president Vladimir Putin. Due to Marat's career, the family often travelled to different places in Uzbekistan, Kazakhstan and Russia.

Rhythmic gymnastics career

Early career
Kabaeva started rhythmic gymnastics at age three, with coach Margarita Samuilovna. In 1993, she represented Kazakhstan at an international competition in Japan.

In her early teens, Kabaeva moved to Moscow, where her mother took her to the Russian head coach, Irina Viner.

1996–1999

Kabaeva stayed with Viner, and made her international debut representing Russia in 1996. The 15-year-old Kabaeva won the 1998 European Championships in Portugal. At the time, she was the youngest member of the Russian squad, competing alongside internationally recognized teammates Amina Zaripova and Yana Batyrshina as well as Irina Tchachina. Kabaeva then became the 1999 European Champion in Hungary, and won the 1999 World Title in Osaka, Japan. Kabaeva went on to win a total of 5 All-Around titles at the European Championships.

At the 2000 Sydney Olympics, in Australia, Kabaeva was expected to claim Gold in All-Around; however, due to an error in an otherwise exceptional performance—she dropped her hoop, and ran to retrieve it outside of the competition area—Kabaeva won the bronze medal, with the final score of 39.466 (Rope 9.925, Hoop 9.641, Ball 9.950, Ribbon 9.950). Belarus's Yulia Raskina took the silver medal, while fellow Russian teammate, Yulia Barsukova, won the Olympic gold medal.

2001–2004

At the 2001 World Championships in Madrid, Spain, Kabaeva won the gold medal for the Ball, Clubs, Hoop, Rope, the Individual All-Around, and the Team competitions. At the 2001 Goodwill Games in Brisbane, Australia, Kabaeva won the gold medal for the Ball, Clubs, and Rope competitions, and the Silver in the Individual All-Around, and Hoop. However, Kabaeva and her teammate, Irina Tchachina, tested positive to a banned diuretic (furosemide), and were stripped of their medals.

Viner, the Russian head coach, who also served as the Vice President of the FIG Rhythmic Gymnastics Technical Committee at the time, said her gymnasts had been taking a food supplement called "Hyper", that contained mild diuretics, which, according to Viner, the gymnasts were taking for premenstrual syndrome. When the supply ran out shortly before the Goodwill Games, the team physiotherapist restocked at a local pharmacy. According to Viner, the supplement sold there was fake and contained furosemide. The Committee requested that the Goodwill Games Organizing Committee nullify Kabaeva and Tchachina's results. The FIG also nullified their results from the World Championships in Madrid, causing Ukraine's Tamara Yerofeeva to be declared the 2001 world champion. Kabaeva was not allowed to participate in competitions from August 2001 to August 2002. Her first international competition after the ban was the 2002 European Championships, where she took first place in the individual all-around.

Kabaeva gained the 2003 World Title in Budapest, Hungary. Kabaeva won the All-Around Gold Medal at the 2003 World Championships, as well as the event final in Ribbon and Ball ahead of Anna Bessonova from Ukraine.

In 2004, Kabaeva won the All-Around Gold at the 2004 European Championships in Kyiv, Ukraine. At the 2004 Athens Olympics, Greece, Kabaeva won the gold medal in the Individual All-Around for Rhythmic Gymnastics, with a score of 108.400 (Hoop 26.800, Ball 27.350, Clubs 27.150, Ribbon 27.100), the Silver Medal went to her teammate, Irina Tchachina.

2005–2007

In October 2004, Kabaeva announced her retirement from the sport. However, in June 2005, the Russian Head Coach Irina Viner announced a possible comeback. Kabaeva resumed her sport career at an Italy-Russia friendly competition in Genoa, on 10 September 2005. On 5 March 2006, Kabaeva won the Gazprom Moscow Grand Prix, with fellow Russians Vera Sessina and Olga Kapranova, taking the Second and Third places. Kabaeva won the silver medal in All-Around at the 2006 European Championships, behind teammate, Sessina.

At the 2007 European Championships in Baku, Azerbaijan; Kabaeva, Sessina, and Kapranova were chosen to represent Russia. However, on the eve of the competition, Kabaeva withdrew due to an injury. Viner selected rising upcoming gymnast Evgenia Kanaeva from Russia's National Team as the replacement. Kabaeva finished fourth in All-Around qualifications at the 2007 World Championships, and did not advance into the finals due to the two per country rule, with Vera Sessina and Olga Kapranova placing ahead of Kabaeva.

2008 Beijing Olympics 
The plans for Kabaeva's participation in the 2008 Olympics were repeatedly announced, but this did not happen.

Doping scandal 
In 2001, the leaders of the world rhythmic gymnastics Russian women Alina Kabaeva and Irina Chashchina were convicted of using furosemide, as a result of which both were disqualified for two years. The athletes were stripped of all the awards of the 2001 Goodwill Games and World Cup. From August 2001 to August 2002, these gymnasts were not allowed to take part in any competitions. The second year of disqualification was given conditionally; that is, they were allowed to compete in official tournaments, but the strictest control was established over them.

Contributions to rhythmic gymnastics
Kabaeva revolutionized rhythmic gymnastics as one of the few gymnasts to have performed new skills and elements, including the back split pivot with hand help (also known as "The Kabaeva"), the ring position with a slow full turn, and the backscale pivot that she first performed.

Rhythmic gymnastic achievements
 Won the 1998 European Championships in the all-around in Porto, Portugal, at 15 years of age, the youngest ever to do so.
 Leveled with Elena Karpukhina as one of the youngest Rhythmic Gymnast to win the All-Around World Championships in 1999 Osaka at 16 years old, until Yana Kudryavtseva of the Russian Federation broke the record winning the All-Around 2013 World Championships at 15 years old.
 Performed the backscale pivot first.
 Holds the record for the most European All-Around titles, in 1998, 1999, 2000, 2002, and 2004.
 Won all Grand-slam titles, and is only one of the three rhythmic gymnasts (with Ekaterina Serebrianskaya and Evgenia Kanaeva) ever to do so.  The titles are: Olympics, World Championships, European Championships, World Cup Final, and Grand Prix Final.
 Became a six time Russian National All-Around Champion, in 1999, 2000, 2001, 2004, 2006, and 2007.

Detailed Olympic results

Routine music information

Post-retirement
Kabaeva was among the six Russian athlete torch bearers who carried the Olympic flame through Fisht Stadium during the Opening Ceremony of the 2014 Sochi Winter Olympics. Her selection as a torch bearer generated controversy in the international media because of her alleged close relationship with President Vladimir Putin.

In 2015, Kabaeva was an honorary guest at the 2015 World Championships in Stuttgart, Germany. In 2017, she became the official FIG Rhythmic Gymnastics Ambassador at the 2017 World Championships in Pesaro, Italy.

Political and media careers
Since 2005, Kabaeva has been a member of the Public Chamber of Russia.

Between 2007 and 2014, Kabaeva was a Member of the Russian Parliament, the State Duma, representing the United Russia party. In her capacity as a Member of Parliament, she voted for a number of controversial laws that were speedily adopted in 2012 and 2013, including the Anti-Magnitsky bill banning inter-country adoption (of Russian orphans) by families in the United States, as well as the Russian gay propaganda law making the distribution of "propaganda of non-traditional sexual relationships" among minors a punishable offense, the extrajudicial ban on access to websites which may host materials violating copyright laws, and the reorganization of the Academy of Sciences.

In September 2014, Kabaeva resigned from the Duma and accepted the position of chair of the board of directors of the National Media Group, the largest Russian media conglomerate. She has faced criticism for her lack of experience and high salary when appointed to political and media posts.

Other ventures
In 2001, Kabaeva appeared in the Japanese movie, Red Shadow, performing a gymnastics routine.

In January 2011, Kabaeva appeared on the cover of Vogue Russia. In the same month, she launched her singing career, taking to the stage for the first time.

Sanctions
Following the 2022 Russian invasion of Ukraine, sanctions were imposed on numerous Russian political and business leaders. In April 2022, the United States Department of the Treasury prepared sanctions against Kabaeva, however the United States government withheld the sanctions for fear of escalating tensions between Russia and the United States due to her alleged relationship with Putin. The Office of Foreign Assets Control added Kabaeva to the Specially Designated Nationals and Blocked Persons List on 3 August 2022, which results in her assets being frozen and U.S. persons being prohibited from dealing with her.

On 13 May 2022, Kabaeva and her grandmother Anna Zatseplina were sanctioned by the United Kingdom. On 27 May, Canada imposed sanctions on Kabaeva. On 3 June, she was sanctioned by the European Union. On 1 July, she was sanctioned by Australia.

Personal life

In April 2008, the Moskovsky Korrespondent reported that Kabaeva was engaged to Russian president Vladimir Putin. The story was denied and the newspaper was shut down. In the following years, the status of Kabaeva and Putin's relationship became a topic of speculation, including allegations that they have multiple children together.

In July 2013, Kabaeva said that she did not have children. In March 2015, she was reported to have given birth to a daughter at the VIP hospital of Saint Ann in Ticino, Switzerland. In 2019, she reportedly gave birth to twin sons at the Kulakov maternity clinic in Moscow. However, the Swiss newspaper SonntagsZeitung reported in 2022 that a Swiss gynecologist of Russian origin assisted at both births, stating that the first in 2015 was of a boy and the second in 2019 of another boy, and that both were Putin's sons.

According to United States and European security officials, Kabaeva has spent long periods of time in Switzerland since 2015, at residences in Lugano and Cologny.

Honours
: Honoured Master of Sports of the Russian Federation (1999)
: Order of Friendship (2001)
: Order "For Merit to the Fatherland" IV Degree (2005)
: Russian Federation Presidential Certificate of Honour (2013)
: Order of Honour (2015)

References

External links 

 
 
 
 Alina Kabaeva at r-gymnastics.com 
  

1983 births
Living people
Gymnasts at the 2000 Summer Olympics
Medalists at the 2000 Summer Olympics
Gymnasts at the 2004 Summer Olympics
Medalists at the 2004 Summer Olympics
Members of the Civic Chamber of the Russian Federation
Olympic bronze medalists for Russia
Olympic gold medalists for Russia
Olympic gymnasts of Russia
Lesgaft National State University of Physical Education, Sport and Health alumni
Olympic medalists in gymnastics
European champions in gymnastics
Sportspeople from Tashkent
Russian rhythmic gymnasts
Russian sportspeople in doping cases
Doping cases in gymnastics
Russian people of Uzbek descent
Russian people of Tatar descent
Tatar people of Russia
Tatar sportspeople
Tatar politicians
Russian sportsperson-politicians
Medalists at the Rhythmic Gymnastics World Championships
Medalists at the Rhythmic Gymnastics European Championships
Converts to Christianity from Islam
Goodwill Games medalists in gymnastics
Competitors at the 1998 Goodwill Games
Competitors at the 2001 Goodwill Games
Recipients of the Order "For Merit to the Fatherland", 4th class
Fifth convocation members of the State Duma (Russian Federation)
Sixth convocation members of the State Duma (Russian Federation)
Family of Vladimir Putin
Specially Designated Nationals and Blocked Persons List
Russian individuals subject to the U.S. Department of the Treasury sanctions
Russian individuals subject to United Kingdom sanctions
Russian individuals subject to European Union sanctions